State Route 178 (SR 178) is a  state highway in the east-central part of the U.S. state of Georgia. It is routed northwest-to-southeast through portions of Toombs and Tattnall counties.

Route description
SR 178 begins at an intersection with US 1/SR 4 (South State Street) in Lyons, in Toombs County. It heads southeast through rural areas until it intersects SR 56, west of Reidsville. The highway continues to the southeast and meets SR 147, near the Georgia State Prison. The two routes head concurrent into Tattnall County. Just prior to crossing over the Ohoopee River, SR 178 curves to the east and continues in that orientation until it meets its eastern terminus, an intersection with SR 121/SR 144/SR 169 southwest of Glennville.

SR 178 is not part of the National Highway System, a system of roadways important to the nation's economy, defense, and mobility.

Major intersections

See also

References

External links

 Georgia Roads (Routes 161 - 180)
 Georgia State Route 178 on State-Ends.com

178
Transportation in Toombs County, Georgia
Transportation in Tattnall County, Georgia